Jose Alex Villalobos (born November 2, 1963) is an American lawyer and former politician. He was a Republican member of the Florida Senate, representing the 38th District from 2001 through 2010. Previously he was a member of the Florida House of Representatives from 1993 through 2000. He served as the Republican Majority Whip from 2001 to 2002 and as the Republican Majority Leader from 2004 to 2006 in the Florida Senate.

He received his (B.A.) degree from the University of Miami and his J.D. degree from Florida State University.  He later served as an Assistant State Attorney for the Second Judicial Circuit of Florida.

He and his wife have one child. His grandfather, Lolo Villalobos was re-elected six consecutive times as mayor of Guanabacoa, Cuba (1940–1959).

Since leaving the legislature, Villalobos has been an outspoken advocate for reform of the judicial system. He is the founding president of Democracy at Stake and also serves on the board of directors for Justice at Stake, a national judicial watchdog group. In 1995 he was an Adjunct Professor of Constitutional Law at Florida International University.

Villalobos is the original incorporator of Accountable Florida Inc., according to the organization's Articles of Incorporation, available on Florida's Department of State website, www.sunbiz.org. Accountable Florida Inc. is an active not-for-profit corporation, with its Articles of Incorporation filed on Feb. 9, 2023.

Villalobos currently practices law and serves as Of Counsel with the firm of Meyer, Brooks, Demma and Blohm.

References

External links
 Florida House of Representatives - J. Alex Villalobos
 Opinion editorial in the Miami Herald
 Justice at Stake press release
 Project Vote Smart profile
 J. Alex Villalobos at Ballotpedia
 Our Campaigns – J. Alex Villalobos (FL) profile

|-

|-

1963 births
Living people
American politicians of Cuban descent
Hispanic and Latino American state legislators in Florida
Republican Party Florida state senators
Florida State University College of Law alumni
Republican Party members of the Florida House of Representatives
University of Miami alumni